Edward Rush  was an Anglican Archdeacon in Ireland in the second half of the nineteenth century.

Rush was educated at Trinity College, Dublin. He was the Rector of Loughrea from 1858; and Archdeacon of Kilmacduagh from 1882, holding both positions until his death.until his death.

Notes

Alumni of Trinity College Dublin
Archdeacons of Kilmacduagh
19th-century Irish Anglican priests
1891 deaths